Juan Raoul Davis "Johnny" Rodriguez (born December 10, 1951) is an American country music singer. He is a Tejano and Texas country music singer, infusing his music with Latin sounds, and even singing verses of songs in Spanish.

In the 1970s and 1980s, he was one of country music's most successful male artists, recording a string of hit songs, such as "You Always Come Back to Hurting Me," "Desperado," "Down on the Rio Grande" and "Foolin'." He has recorded six No. 1 country hits in his career.

Early life
Rodriguez was born in Sabinal, Texas, situated 90 miles from Mexico. He was the second youngest in a family of 10 children living in a four-room house. Growing up in Sabinal, Rodriguez was a good student in school and an altar boy for his church. He was also the captain of his junior high school football team. When Rodriguez was 16 years old, his father died of cancer, and his older brother, Andres, died in an automobile accident the following year. The two incidents had an effect on Rodriguez and he became a troubled teen. 

In 1969, at age 18, Rodriguez ended up in jail. He sang frequently in his cell and was overheard by Texas Ranger Joaquin Jackson, who was impressed and told promoter "Happy" Shahan about him. (The common story told is that he was arrested after he and some friends were caught stealing and barbecuing a goat, although Jackson would later state that Rodriguez was in jail simply for an unpaid fine.)

Shahan then hired Johnny to perform at his local tourist attraction called the Alamo Village. During one of his sets in 1971, he came to the attention of country singers Tom T. Hall and Bobby Bare, who encouraged the young singer to go to Nashville, Tennessee. The 21-year-old singer arrived in Nashville with only a guitar in his hand and $14 in his pocket. Hall soon found work for Rodriguez fronting his band, as well as writing songs.

Less than one year later, Hall took Rodriguez to Mercury Records' Nashville division and landed him an audition with the record label. After performing the songs "I Can't Stop Loving You" and "If I Left It Up to You," he was offered a contract with Mercury. He signed and began recording in their Nashville studio.

Career

Career in the 1970s
After signing with Mercury, his first single to be released was 1972's "Pass Me By (If You're Only Passing Through)." This recording was a success, going to No. 9 on the Hot Country Songs list that year. Rodriguez became the first well-known American of Mexican descent as a country singer.

In 1972, Rodriguez was voted the 'Most Promising Vocalist' by the Academy of Country Music. The next year, he achieved his first No. 1 hit song, "You Always Come Back to Hurting Me." Another song that year, "Ridin' My Thumb to Mexico," was also a  No. 1 hit. Both songs were listed in the Billboard Hot 100. Rodriguez wrote some of his own material such as the song "Ridin' My Thumb to Mexico." 

In 1973, his debut album was released, which rose to No. 1 on the Top Country Albums chart. He was nominated for Male Vocalist of the Year by the CMA Awards. In addition to his success in country music, he also had a role on the television show Adam-12 and also made a guest appearance on The Dating Game in 1974.

In 1975, all three singles he released reached to No. 1 on the country chart: "I Just Can't Get Her Out of My Mind" "Just Get Up and Close the Door," and "Love Put a Song in My Heart." Rodriguez's success on the country chart continued throughout much of the 1970s. He recorded songs not only written by himself around this time, but also covers of songs such as George Harrison's "Something," Linda Hargrove's "Just Get Up and Close the Door," Mickey Newbury's "Poison Red Berries," and Billy Joe Shaver's "Texas Up Here Tennessee." By 1975, Rodriguez was considered a member of the outlaw country market in country music, like fellow musicians Bobby Bare and Tom T. Hall.

Career in the 1980s and 1990s and murder charge
Despite the outlaw movement fading from view in the late 1970s, Rodriguez was determined to stay on top of his game. In 1979, he switched to Epic Records. There he worked with the record producer Billy Sherrill. His first hit from Epic came that year with the No. 6 country hit, "Down on the Rio Grande." His debut album from the record company was entitled Rodriguez, although all the songs from the album were cover versions.

Although Rodriguez did not make the Top 10 continuously as in the past, he managed to stay in the Top 20, with hits like "Fools For Each Other" and "What'll I Tell Virginia." At the same time, Rodriguez continued to be a popular concert attraction. However, Rodriguez was also having personal problems, due to his drug addiction. In 1982, he did a duet with Zella Lehr on the song "Most Beautiful Girl (La Chica Mas Linda)." The single was released by Columbia Records. In 1983, he went into the Top 5 with the hit song "Foolin'," followed by the Top 10 hit "How Could I Love Her So Much." However, by the mid-1980s, he was becoming less successful and, in 1986, he left Epic Records.

In 1987, he signed with Capitol Records for a brief period of time. He had his last major hit in 1988 with "I Didn't (Every Chance I Had)," which reached No. 12 on the country chart. By 1989, he had left Capitol.

In August 1998, Rodriguez shot and killed a 28-year-old acquaintance in his Texas home, believing the man to be a burglar. In October 1999, he was acquitted of murder by a jury.

In 1993, he recorded an album for Intersound Records called Run For the Border. In the mid-1990s, the indie label High-Tone released his album, You Can Say That Again. He continued to tour around the country during this time. In 1996, he turned to another label, Paula Records, which issued "One Bar At a Time", but it was unsuccessful. By this time his musical presence was fading from the public view.

1998–present
Since 1998, Rodriguez has toured the United States and further afield including Switzerland, Poland, UK, South Korea, Canada, and Mexico. He has performed concerts at the Ryman Auditorium and Carnegie Hall.

Rodriguez continues to tour and record new material, performing dates in the United States and Canada. In 2012, he released his first live album, Johnny Rodriguez: Live from Texas.

Awards and recognition
Rodriguez has been honored by three U.S. presidents: Jimmy Carter, George H. W. Bush, and George W. Bush. He played at George H.W. Bush's inaugural ball.

On August 18, 2007, Rodriguez was inducted into the Texas Country Music Hall of Fame, located in Carthage, Texas.

On October 23, 2010, Rodriguez received the Institute of Hispanic Culture Pioneer Award, in recognition of his accomplishment as the first major Hispanic singer in country music.

Personal life
Rodriguez was first married to Linda Diann Patterson, a Southern Airways flight attendant from Conyers, Georgia. His second marriage was in 1995 to Lana Nelson, daughter of country singer/songwriter Willie Nelson. That marriage lasted seven months. His most recent marriage was to Debbie McNeely, a hair salon owner from San Marcos, Texas, in 1998, with whom he had a daughter, Aubry Rae Rodriguez born in April 1998.

Discography

References

External links
[ Johnny Rodriguez] at AllMusic
Johnny Rodriguez at  NME

1951 births
People from Sabinal, Texas
American country singer-songwriters
American male singer-songwriters
Singer-songwriters from Texas
Living people
Mercury Records artists
Epic Records artists
Capitol Records artists
American musicians of Mexican descent
Country musicians from Texas
Hispanic and Latino American musicians